The Vital Records Act of 1977 is a Tennessee statute that prohibits individuals from changing their sex on the original birth certificate as a result of sex change surgery. Tennessee is the only state specifically forbidding the correction of sex designations on birth certificates of transgender people.

References

1977 in American law
1977 in LGBT history
Discrimination against LGBT people in the United States
Rights
Politics of Tennessee
Tennessee law
Transgender law in the United States
1977 in Tennessee